David Ward may refer to:

David Ward (American football) (1907–1982), American football end
David Ward (bowls) (1945–2005), England lawn and indoor bowler
David Ward (British politician) (born 1953), British Liberal Democrat politician, MP for Bradford East (2010–2015)
David Ward (cricketer, born 1981), Australian-born English former cricketer
David Ward (diplomat), British diplomat
David Ward (palaeontologist) (born 1948), British palaeontologist
David Ward (rugby league) (born 1953), English rugby league footballer
David Ward (sheriff), law enforcement officer in Oregon
David Ward (bass) (1922–1983), operatic bass
David Ward (Surrey cricketer) (born 1961), English batsman
David Ward (university president) (born 1938), president of the American Council on Education, 2001–2008
David Ward (Wisconsin politician) (born 1953), American Republican politician from Wisconsin
David C. Ward (born 1952), American historian, poet and author
David Jenkins Ward (1871–1961), American politician
David S. Ward (born 1945), American film director
 David Ward (1936–2016), known as Kiviaq, Inuit lawyer, politician, and former athlete

See also
David Ward King (1857–1920), farmer and inventor
David Ward-Steinman (1936–2015), composer
Dave Ward (disambiguation)